Anthony J. Mifsud is a Maltese-born Canadian actor, singer and songwriter. He performs professionally under the moniker Mif.

Career
Mif began his entertainment career in Toronto as the singer for hard rock/heavy metal musical group Slash Puppet (1989–1995).   Mif released two CDs with Slash Puppet, but left the band in 1995.

On June 6, 2016, he released an EP, My Insane Friends, was released digitally for online downloading and streaming through CD Baby and its worldwide distribution affiliates including iTunes, Spotify and Pandora Radio. A departure from his musical styling with Slash Puppet, the songs are described as darker, heavier and more progressive. A video for the song "Born Inside The Shell" was also released on the same day.

Mif is also an actor who has appeared both nationally and internationally in numerous film and television productions. His film credits include such films as Kick-Ass 2, D-Tox, Detention, Just Business, Foolproof, Direct Action, Robocop: Prime Directives, Dirty Work, The Stupids, Gossip and Partners in Action.  In the martial arts action thriller Welcome to Sudden Death (Universal) Mif plays Devlin Montez the dubious and deceptive head of security of the Odessey Arena. Touted as a remake or prequel of the 1995 Jean-Claude Van Damme film Sudden Death it was released on Netflix US (digital streaming and on DVD internationally) on September 29, 2020, hitting #5 after just one day and as high as #3 as the most watched film in the "Top 10 Movies List" in the US where it stayed for almost a week, ultimately making it to #6 as the most watched program across all platforms on Netflix US.

On television, Mif is currently being featured in the recurring character of the Greek Delivery Man in the third and final season of the Netflix Original Series Hemlock Grove. Entitled "The Final Chapter" the American horror thriller began streaming on October 23, 2015. He also continues to be featured in the recurring role of Dr. Necros in the Disney Action Adventure series Aaron Stone, that premiered February 13, 2009 when Disney launched their new TV network Disney XD, internationally.  Other notable guest starring appearances and episodic roles on television include such shows as 12 Monkeys, Incorporated, Beauty & the Beast, Warehouse 13, Queer as Folk, This Is Wonderland, Once a Thief, Due South, Psi Factor, F/X: The Series, Kung Fu: The Legend Continues and Relic Hunter. As a voice artist, his voice has been heard on several radio and television network programs and commercial spots across North America, pitching products for such sponsors as Bailey's Irish Cream, Hewlett-Packard, Acura, Sony, Molson, Labatts, Chrysler, Ford, General Motors, Canada Post and Kelloggs.  Writing credits include several local sport publications, as well as such national magazines as Fresh, Canadian Musician, M.E.A.T Magazine, Inside Soccer and The Soccer News.

Filmography

Films

Television

Voice

Discography

Awards

References

External links 

Anthony J. Mifsud (Official) Vimeo

Year of birth missing (living people)
Living people
Maltese emigrants to Canada
Canadian male singers
Canadian rock singers
Male actors from Toronto
Musicians from Toronto
Canadian male film actors
Canadian male television actors
Canadian male voice actors